A snail is a shelled gastropod. The name is most often applied to land snails, terrestrial pulmonate gastropod molluscs. However, the common name snail is also used for most of the members of the molluscan class Gastropoda that have a coiled shell that is large enough for the animal to retract completely into. When the word "snail" is used in this most general sense, it includes not just land snails but also numerous species of sea snails and freshwater snails. Gastropods that naturally lack a shell, or have only an internal shell, are mostly called slugs, and land snails that have only a very small shell (that they cannot retract into) are often called semi-slugs.

Snails have considerable human relevance, including as food items, as pests, and as vectors of disease, and their shells are used as decorative objects and are incorporated into jewelry. The snail has also had some cultural significance, tending to be associated with lethargy. The snail has also been used as a figure of speech in reference to slow-moving things. The snail is the same or similar shape as the cochlea.

Overview
Snails that respire using a lung belong to the group Pulmonata. As traditionally defined, the Pulmonata were found to be polyphyletic in a molecular study per Jörger et al., dating from 2010. But snails with gills also form a polyphyletic group; in other words, snails with lungs and snails with gills form a number of taxonomic groups that are not necessarily more closely related to each other than they are related to some other groups.

Both snails that have lungs and snails that have gills have diversified so widely over geological time that a few species with gills can be found on land and numerous species with lungs can be found in freshwater. Even a few marine species have lungs.

Snails can be found in a very wide range of environments, including ditches, deserts, and the abyssal depths of the sea. Although land snails may be more familiar to laymen, marine snails constitute the majority of snail species, and have much greater diversity and a greater biomass. Numerous kinds of snail can also be found in fresh water.

Most snails have thousands of microscopic tooth-like structures located on a banded ribbon-like tongue called a radula. The radula works like a file, ripping food into small pieces. Many snails are herbivorous, eating plants or rasping algae from surfaces with their radulae, though a few land species and many marine species are omnivores or predatory carnivores. Snails cannot absorb colored pigments when eating paper or cardboard so their feces are also colored.

Recently, the smallest land snails, Angustopila dominikae,  have  been discovered in China, and measure 0.86mm long.

The snail Lymnaea makes decisions by using only two types of neurons: one deciding whether the snail is hungry, and the other deciding whether there is food in the vicinity.

It weighed exactly 900 g (2 lb). Named Gee Geronimo, this snail was owned by Christopher Hudson (1955–79) of Hove, East Sussex, UK, and was collected in Sierra Leone in June 1976.

Diet

Snails eating habits vary widely, with some being generalists and some being specialist feeders.  Snails feed at night. They feed primarily on decaying organic matter. Their diet also includes fungi, lichens, green foliage, worms, centipedes, insects, animal feces, carrion, and other slugs. Some snails feed on other snails too.

Types of snails by habitat

Slugs

Gastropods that lack a conspicuous shell are commonly called slugs rather than snails. Some species of slug have a maroon-brown shell, some have only an internal vestige that serves mainly as a calcium lactate repository, and others have some to no shell at all. Other than that there is little morphological difference between slugs and snails. There are however important differences in habitats and behavior.

A shell-less animal is much more maneuverable and compressible, so even quite large land slugs can take advantage of habitats or retreats with very little space, retreats that would be inaccessible to a similar-sized snail. Slugs squeeze themselves into confined spaces such as under loose bark on trees or under stone slabs, logs or wooden boards lying on the ground. In such retreats they are in less danger from either predators or desiccation. Those are often suitable places for laying their eggs.

Slugs as a group are far from monophyletic; scientifically speaking "slug" is a term of convenience with little taxonomic significance. The reduction or loss of the shell has evolved many times independently within several very different lineages of gastropods. The various taxa of land and sea gastropods with slug morphology occur within numerous higher taxonomic groups of shelled species; such independent slug taxa are not in general closely related to one another.

Human relevance

Land snails are known as an agricultural and garden pest but some species are an edible delicacy and occasionally household pets. In addition, their mucus can also be used for skin care products.

In agriculture
There are a variety of snail-control measures that gardeners and farmers use in an attempt to reduce damage to valuable plants. Traditional pesticides are still used, as are many less toxic control options such as concentrated garlic or wormwood solutions. Copper metal is also a snail repellent, and thus a copper band around the trunk of a tree will prevent snails from climbing up and reaching the foliage and fruit. A layer of a dry, finely ground, and scratchy substance such as diatomaceous earth can also deter snails.

The decollate snail (Rumina decollata) will capture and eat garden snails, and because of this it has sometimes been introduced as a biological pest control agent. However, this is not without problems, as the decollate snail is just as likely to attack and devour other gastropods that may represent a valuable part of the native fauna of the region.

As food

In French cuisine, edible snails are served for instance in Escargot à la Bourguignonne. The practice of rearing snails for food is known as heliciculture. For purposes of cultivation, the snails are kept in a dark place in a wired cage with dry straw or dry wood. Coppiced wine-grape vines are often used for this purpose. During the rainy period, the snails come out of hibernation and release most of their mucus onto the dry wood/straw. The snails are then prepared for cooking. Their texture when cooked is slightly chewy and tender.

As well as being relished as gourmet food, several species of land snails provide an easily harvested source of protein to many people in poor communities around the world. Many land snails are valuable because they can feed on a wide range of agricultural wastes, such as shed leaves in banana plantations. In some countries, giant African land snails are produced commercially for food.

Land snails, freshwater snails and sea snails are all eaten in many countries. In certain parts of the world snails are fried. For example, in Indonesia, they are fried as satay, a dish known as sate kakul. The eggs of certain snail species are eaten in a fashion similar to the way caviar is eaten. 

In Bulgaria, snails are traditionally cooked in an oven with rice or fried in a pan with vegetable oil and red paprika powder. Before they are used for those dishes, however, they are thoroughly boiled in hot water (for up to 90 minutes) and manually extracted from their shells. The two species most commonly used for food in the country are Helix lucorum and Helix pomatia.

Famine food
Snails and slug species that are not normally eaten in certain areas have occasionally been used as famine food in historical times. A history of Scotland written in the 1800s recounts a description of various snails and their use as food items in times of plague.

Parasitic diseases
Snails can also be associated with parasitic diseases such as schistosomiasis, angiostrongyliasis, fasciolopsiasis, opisthorchiasis, fascioliasis, paragonimiasis and clonorchiasis, which can be transmitted to humans.

Cultural depictions

Symbolism 
Because of its slowness, the snail has traditionally been seen as a symbol of laziness. In Christian culture, it has been used as a symbol of the deadly sin of sloth. Psalms  uses snail slime as a metaphorical punishment. In Mayan mythology, the snail is associated with sexual desire, being personified by the god Uayeb.

Divination and other religious uses 

Snails were widely noted and used in divination. The Greek poet Hesiod wrote that snails signified the time to harvest by climbing the stalks, while the Aztec moon god Tecciztecatl bore a snail shell on his back. This symbolised rebirth; the snail's penchant for appearing and disappearing was analogised with the moon.

Love darts and Cupid 

Professor Ronald Chase of McGill University in Montreal has suggested the ancient myth of Cupid's arrows might be based on early observations of the love dart behavior of the land snail species Cornu aspersum.

Metaphor 
In contemporary speech, the expression "a snail's pace" is often used to describe a slow, inefficient process. The phrase "snail mail" is used to mean regular postal service delivery of paper messages as opposed to the delivery of email, which can be virtually instantaneous. 

In medieval and Renaissance manuscripts snails are depicted as a comic relief due to the similarity between the armour of knights and the shell of snails.

In Indonesian mythology 

Keong Emas (Javanese and Indonesian for Golden Snail) is a popular Javanese folklore about a princess magically transformed and contained in a golden snail shell. The folklore is a part of popular Javanese Panji cycle telling the stories about the prince Panji Asmoro Bangun (also known as Raden Inu Kertapati) and his consort, princess Dewi Sekartaji (also known as Dewi Chandra Kirana).

Textiles
Certain varieties of snails, notably the family Muricidae, produce a secretion that is a color-fast natural dye. The ancient Tyrian purple was made in this way as were other purple and blue dyes. The extreme expense of extracting this secretion is sufficient quantities limited its use to the very wealthy. It is such dyes as these that led to certain shades of purple and blue being associated with royalty and wealth.

As pets 
Throughout history, snails have been kept as pets. There are many famous snails such as Lefty (Born Jeremy) and within fiction, Gary and Brian the snail.

See also
 Gastropod shell
 Pasilalinic-sympathetic compass
 Jeremy (snail)
 Land snail
 Freshwater snail
 Sea snail

References

Gallery

External links

 Introduction to Snails, Infoqis Publishing, Co.

Articles containing video clips
Mollusc common names

Paraphyletic groups